M&M Studios, was a dubbing and subtitling studio established in 1986, in Caracas, Venezuela. The studio was originally called Estudios LAIN And Other name Meta & Modular Traducción Visual. They have worked with some of the most important names in the industry, including: Nickelodeon Latin America, MTV, Sony, AXN, Animax, Chello Latin America (formerly MGM Networks Latin America), A&E Networks, CCI Entertainment, Inti Networks, BBC Latin America and Cinemania, among others.

Currently, they offer dubbing into Neutral Spanish and Brazilian Portuguese, as well as open subtitles and closed captions in both languages. M&M Studio has offices in Caracas, Venezuela, as well as in Miami, Florida. They also have partners in São Paulo, Brazil.

Animated cartoons dubbing (Warner Bros., Disney, MTV, YouTube, Hanna-Barbera) 
.hack//Legend of the Twilight
Arthur
Baby Baachan
Basilisk
Black Cat
Bokurano
Burst Angel
Matantei Loki Ragnarok
Dear Boys
Di Gi Charat Nyo
DNA²
Excel Saga
Fairy Tail
Fate/stay night
Fullmetal Alchemist
Galaxy Angel
Gantz
GetBackers
Gankutsuou
.hack//SIGN
Hell Girl
Humanoid Monster Bem
I'm Gonna Be An Angel!
Last Exile
Max and Ruby 
Martha Speaks
Mushishi
My Little Pony: Friendship is Magic
Noir
Peppa Pig 
Pinky Dinky Doo 
Pita Ten
Planet Survival
R.O.D. the TV
Samurai 7
S-CRY-ed
Solty Rei
Speed Grapher
Steel Angel Kurumi
Stratos 4
The Backyardigans
Thomas & Friends
Trinity Blood
Tsukihime
Twin Spica
The Twelve Kingdoms
Vandread
Vandread: The Second Stage
Wow! Wow! Wubbzy!
Wolf's Rain
xxxHOLiC
Yin Yang Yo!

Nickelodeon
Danny Phantom
My Life as a Teenage Robot
Tak and the Power of Juju
As Told by Ginger
Fanboy & Chum Chum
The Mighty B!

External links
Official Website

Defunct companies of Venezuela
Dubbing studios
Television production companies of Venezuela